The European Tour 2015/2016 – Event 6 (also known as the 2016 Gdynia Open) was a professional minor-ranking snooker tournament held between 23 and 28 February 2016 in Gdynia, Poland.

Neil Robertson was the defending champion, but he chose not to defend his title. Local 12-year-old Antoni Kowalski attracted attention with a 4–1 win over Liam Taylor in the opening round, before being beaten 4–0 by Richard Beckham in the next.

Prize fund
The breakdown of prize money of the event is shown below:

Main draw

Preliminary rounds

Round 1
Best of 7 frames

Round 2
Best of 7 frames

Round 3
Best of 7 frames

Main rounds

Top half

Section 1

Section 2

Section 3

Section 4

Bottom half

Section 5

Section 6

Section 7

Section 8

Finals

Century breaks 

 139  Anthony Hamilton
 139  Rod Lawler
 136, 122  Andrew Higginson
 136  Noppon Saengkham
 135, 123, 103  Barry Hawkins
 133  Richard Beckham
 132  Tian Pengfei
 130, 108  Stephen Maguire
 129  Martin O'Donnell
 128  Graeme Dott
 127, 125, 116, 104  Martin Gould
 125, 107, 103  Marco Fu
 125, 101  Sam Baird
 125  Robbie Williams
 123, 100  Mitchell Mann
 123  Zhang Anda
 121, 110, 104, 101  Mark Selby

 120  Mark King
 119  Mark Davis
 118, 104  Joe Perry
 115  Robin Hull
 114, 108  Ryan Day
 112, 103, 100  Kyren Wilson
 111  Luca Brecel
 109  Rory McLeod
 107  Ben Woollaston
 105  Zhou Yuelong
 104, 102  Alan McManus
 104, 101  Tom Ford
 104  Michael White
 103  Eden Sharav
 102  Louis Heathcote 
 101, 100  Dominic Dale

References

ET6
Gdynia Open
2016 in Polish sport
February 2016 sports events in Europe